The Lockhart River air disaster occurred on 7 May 2005, when Aero-Tropics Air Services Flight 675 crashed while on approach to land at Lockhart River Airport in Queensland, Australia, on a ridge known as South Pap 6 nautical miles (11 km) north-west of the airport. All fifteen on board died as the aircraft was completely destroyed by impact forces and subsequent fire. The Fairchild Swearingen Metroliner commuter aircraft, registered  was owned by Transair Ltd and operated by Aero-Tropics. The flight was scheduled from Bamaga on Cape York to the regional centre of Cairns, with a stopover in Lockhart River. It was the worst air crash in Australia in 36 years since MacRobertson Miller Airlines Flight 1750 on 31 December 1968.

Investigation

The Queensland Coroner's Inquest in 2007, found that, despite evidence that there were a number of issues leading up to the crash, pilot error was the prime cause. Families of those who lost their lives in the disaster have been highly critical of the Coroner's findings and the deficiencies in the operations of the regulator, the Civil Aviation Safety Authority (CASA), and the poor company structure and practices of Transair Ltd.

The investigation was aided by flight information from the aircraft's  flight data recorder. As the cockpit voice recorder was unserviceable, and had been for some time, the conversations occurring between the flight crew will never be known.

Senate inquiry
As a result of intense lobbying by the father of one of the victims, Constable Sally Urquhart, and others, the Australian Senate's Rural and Regional Affairs and Transport Committee resolved to conduct an inquiry into the Civil Aviation Safety Authority, its operations and other matters. The Inquiry was convened on 2–3 July 2008 at Parliament House, Canberra. As well as Mr Shane Urquhart's submission, there were sixty others which were considered by the Inquiry. The vast majority of the submissions were highly critical of most aspects of CASA's operations. Several people and organisations, including Mr Urquhart, supported their submissions in person at the Inquiry. In September 2008, the Committee Chair, Senator Glenn Sterle, released the report of the inquiry to the Transport Minister Mr Anthony Albanese and the public.

The recommendations from the report are:
1. That the Australian Government strengthens CASA's governance framework and administrative capability by:
a. introducing a small board of up to five members to provide enhanced oversight and strategic direction for CASA; and
b. undertaking a review of CASA's funding arrangements to ensure CASA is equipped to deal with new regulatory challenges.
2. In accordance with the findings of the Hawke Taskforce, that CASA's Regulatory Reform Program be brought to a conclusion as quickly as possible to provide certainty to industry and to ensure CASA and industry are ready to address future safety challenges.
3. That the Australian National Audit Office audit CASA's implementation and administration of its Safety Management Systems approach.

Further incidents
Following the Lockhart River crash, Transair in Australia went into liquidation in late 2006. Aerotropics also no longer operates because the Civil Aviation Safety Authority cancelled its Air Operator Certificate due to ongoing safety breaches. Transair continued to operate its PNG business until 31 August 2010 when the company's Cessna Citation ran off the runway on landing at Misima Island near Milne Bay, Papua New Guinea. The previous owner of Transair in Australia, Les Wright, died along with three others in the ensuing inferno. There was one survivor.

Notes

References
Sydney Morning Herald
 Finding of Inquest: Inquest into the Aircraft Crash at Lockhart River. Office of the State Coroner 17 August 2007 Brisbane, Queensland
 Senate Committee Report: Rural and Regional Affairs and Transport. "Administration of the Civil Aviation Safety Authority (CASA) and related matters" September 2008

Airliner accidents and incidents involving controlled flight into terrain
Aviation accidents and incidents in 2005
Accidents and incidents involving the Fairchild Swearingen Metroliner
Aviation accidents and incidents in Queensland
Disasters in Queensland
Far North Queensland
2000s in Queensland
May 2005 events in Australia
2005 disasters in Australia